Juan Santos da Silva (born 6 March 2002), commonly known as Juan, is a Brazilian professional footballer who plays for São Paulo FC as a forward.

Career statistics

Club

Notes

References

External links

2002 births
Living people
Brazilian footballers
Brazil youth international footballers
Association football forwards
Campeonato Brasileiro Série A players
Associação Desportiva São Caetano players
União Agrícola Barbarense Futebol Clube players
São Paulo FC players
Footballers from São Paulo